Howard Green (September 10, 1925 – October 31, 2015) was an American scientist, and George Higginson Professor of Cell Biology at Harvard Medical School.

He was the first to culture human cells in a laboratory setting for therapeutic use. He is one of the founding fathers of stem-cell research and regenerative medicine. One famous case involving Doctor Green concerned Jamie and Glenn Selby, two children from Wyoming who were burned over 95% of their bodies. Green cut small patches of undamaged skin from the boys, grew them in a lab and was able to harvest skin grafts to cover their burns.

Education and personal life 
Howard Green was born in 1925 in Toronto, Ontario. He graduated from University of Toronto medical school. 
He served in the United States Army. He taught at New York University School of Medicine, Massachusetts Institute of Technology from 1970 to 1980, and Harvard Medical School from 1980 to 1993.

Green married Rosine Kauffmann Green née Kauffmann in  1954.

He died on October 31, 2015, outside Boston, Massachusetts.

On November 23, 2016, Shriner's Hospitals for Children in Boston announced the opening of the Howard Green Center for Children's Skin Health and Research, funded by a $3 million gift from his wife, Mrs. Rosine Kauffmann Green.

Academic positions held

Harvard Medical School 

George Higginson Professor of Cell Biology

Chairman - Department of Cellular and Molecular Physiology 1980-1993

Head of Green Lab

Massachusetts Institute of Technology 

Professor of Cell Biology

New York University School of Medicine 

Faculty member of the Department of Pathology

Awards and honors

Publications

Book 

Therapy with Cultured Cells - book published 2010

Selected academic articles

References 

American biologists
American medical researchers
Members of the United States National Academy of Sciences
Fellows of the American Academy of Arts and Sciences
Members of the French Academy of Sciences
1925 births
2015 deaths
New York University faculty